Vitaliy Hryhorovych Khmelnytskyi (12 June 1943 – 13 February 2019) was a Ukrainian  football player and coach.

Honours
 Soviet Top League winner: 1966, 1967, 1968, 1971
 Soviet Cup winner: 1964, 1966

International career
He capped 20 times for USSR, playing the 1970 FIFA World Cup.

References

External links
Profile

1943 births
2019 deaths
People from Reichskommissariat Ukraine
Ukrainian footballers
Soviet footballers
Soviet Union international footballers
Soviet Top League players
FC Shakhtar Donetsk players
FC Dynamo Kyiv players
FC Mariupol players
1970 FIFA World Cup players
Soviet football managers
Ukrainian football managers
FC Dnipro Cherkasy managers
FC Kryvbas Kryvyi Rih managers
Association football forwards
Sportspeople from Zaporizhzhia Oblast